Salehabad-e Sharqi (also Romanized as Şāleḩābād-e Sharqī; also known as Shahrak-e Şāleḩābād-e Sharqī, Shahrak-e Şāleḩābād, Sālehābād, and Şāleḩābād) is a village in Azimiyeh Rural District, in the Central District of Ray County, Tehran Province, Iran. At the 2006 census, its population was 5,753, in 1,349 families.

References 

Populated places in Ray County, Iran